Vali Asr (also Romanized as Valī ‘Aşr; also known as Ilanjegh, Īlānjūq, and Yelānjūq) is a village in Yurchi-ye Gharbi Rural District, Kuraim District, Nir County, Ardabil Province, Iran. At the 2006 census, its population was 400, in 93 families.

References 

Tageo

Towns and villages in Nir County